Rich and Famous may refer to:

Theatre and film
 Rich and Famous (play), a 1974 John Guare play
 Rich and Famous (1981 film), starring Jacqueline Bisset and Candice Bergen
 Rich and Famous (1987 film), Hong Kong film directed by Taylor Wong
 Rich and Famous a show from the ITV Studios

Music
 Rich and Famous (Buddy Rich album), a 1983 album by the Buddy Rich Big Band
 Rich and Famous (Blue Mercedes album), a 1988 album by Blue Mercedes.
 Rich and Famous (Vice Squad album), by U.K band Vice Squad produced by Paul Rooney
 Rich & Famous, an EP by Accept
"Rich and Famous", a song written by Kai Hansen and performed by German power metal band Gamma Ray